Massilia oculi is a Gram-negative, rod-shaped, non-spore-forming bacterium  from the genus Massilia and  family Oxalobacteraceae, which was isolated from a patient suffering from endophthalmitis. Its 16S rRNA gene sequence analysis has shown that it belongs to ''Massilia.

References

External links
Type strain of Massilia oculi at BacDive -  the Bacterial Diversity Metadatabase

Burkholderiales
Bacteria described in 2012